The 2009 Men's South American Volleyball Club Championship was the first official edition of the men's volleyball tournament, played by eight teams over 7–11 November 2009 in Florianópolis, Brazil. The winning team qualified for the 2009 FIVB Men's Club World Championship.

Competing clubs

First round

Pool A

|}

|}

Pool B

|}

|}

Championship Round

Semifinals

|}

Final

|}

Final standing

References

2009 in volleyball
2009 in Brazilian sport
2009
International volleyball competitions hosted by Brazil